The SCW Heavyweight Championship was a professional wrestling championship in Steel City Wrestling (SCW). The title was the top championship of the SCW promotion. It was the first singles championship established in SCW, having been introduced in 1994, in the finals of a four-man tournament.

The inaugural champion was T. Rantula, who defeated Shane Douglas in a tournament final on October 8, 1994 to become the first SCW Heavyweight Champion. T. Rantula holds the record for most reigns, with four. At 892 days, Johnny Gunn first and only reign is the longest in the title's history. T. Rantula's third reign was the shortest in the history of the title having been stripped of the championship the day after he won it. The previous champion, Cueball Carmichael, had won control of SCW for 30 days prior to their match. He justified the decision as T. Rantula had been a substitute for his originally scheduled opponent Dennis Gregory. Overall, there have been 12 reigns shared between 7 wrestlers, with one vacancy, and 1 deactivation.

Title history
Key

List of combined reigns

References
General

Specific

External links
SCW Heavyweight Championship at Cagematch.net
SCW Heavyweight Championship at Wrestlingdata.com

Heavyweight wrestling championships
Steel City Wrestling